The 1919 New Hampshire football team was an American football team that represented New Hampshire College of Agriculture and the Mechanic Arts during the 1919 college football season—the school became the University of New Hampshire in 1923. In its fourth season under head coach William "Butch" Cowell, the team compiled a 7–2 record, while outscoring their opponents by a total of 113 to 29. No opponent scored more than seven points against New Hampshire during the season, and the team won four of its games by shutout. This was the first season that the school fielded a freshman football team, in addition to the varsity.

Schedule

The September 27 game was marred by the death of Connecticut center Gardner Dow, who was knocked unconscious while making a tackle; he died later that evening in Durham. Connecticut's athletic fields in Storrs were subsequently named after Dow. Governor of New Hampshire John H. Bartlett was in attendance at the game.

The November 8 game remains the last time that the Worcester Tech—now Worcester Polytechnic Institute (WPI)—and New Hampshire football programs have met.

The November 15 contest against Maine ended in controversy, as New Hampshire attempted a trick play in the final minute of the game, potentially scoring and taking a 9–7 lead. The referee was indecisive, and the head coaches of both teams agreed that a ruling on the play should be made by the "central board of officials". The play in question happened on a New Hampshire punt; a New Hampshire player, who had been behind the punter at the time the ball was kicked, recovered the untouched ball in Maine's end zone, resulting in either a touchdown for New Hampshire or a touchback for Maine. The play was intended to have the attributes of a free kick, during which the ball can be recovered by either team. On November 18, officials ruled that the play had to be treated as a punt and not a free kick, deeming the outcome a touchback, and declaring Maine the winner.

Notes

References

New Hampshire
New Hampshire Wildcats football seasons
New Hampshire football